The Wheeler No. 1 Oil Well was the first well drilled in the Drumright-Cushing Oil Field of northeast Oklahoma, near Drumright. The success of the well, drilled in 1912 by Thomas Baker Slick, Sr., led to the development of the Cushing field and gave impetus to the early development of Oklahoma oilfields. The Drumright-Cushing field would go on to produce 310,000 barrels of oil a day at its peak in May 1917. The well made Slick's name as "King of the Wildcatters".

The well was financed by Charles B. Shaffer of Chicago, who hired Slick to drill wells at the Frank Wheeler farm using cable tool drilling techniques, which could not prevent gushers or blowouts. Because no mechanism existed to control the flow, the oil was diverted into pits for collection and storage. The source of the oil was a sand zone in the Drumright Dome, a syncline. Slick attempted to keep the strike secret, hiring armed guards,  but eventually revealed the well's success in April 1912. A dugout built for the guards remains on the site, together with a commemorative plaque.

In time, the well's pressure subsided, requiring that the oil be pumped out of the well. The first pump was a two-cylinder gasoline-powered pump, later replaced by an electric drive. With the reduction in pressure the well was modified for secondary recovery, using an early form of hydraulic fracturing called "sand fracturing." As of 1980 it produced about a barrel a day, pumping four hours a day. The well was still producing in 2012.

The Wheeler No. 1 well was placed on the National Register of Historic Places on March 14, 1983.

References

Oil wells in Oklahoma
Buildings and structures in Creek County, Oklahoma
Industrial buildings and structures on the National Register of Historic Places in Oklahoma
Buildings and structures completed in 1912
1912 establishments in Oklahoma
National Register of Historic Places in Creek County, Oklahoma
Oil wells on the National Register of Historic Places